Sunrise Christian School is a Pentecostal school located across five campuses in South Australia. It is a member of the Adelaide Christian Schools group of schools.  The group comprises Sunrise, Temple Christian College, Sunrise Christian School, Whyalla and Sunrise Bethel Christian School in Port Moresby, PNG. The original campus is located in Fullarton and this location still hosts a campus which serves as the emotional "home" of the Sunrise network.

The school was started in 1978 with approximately 30 students.  In the years since it has grown to five campuses comprising 1000+ students.

The Marion Campus is the only current Sunrise campus which goes through to year 12.

References

External links

1978 establishments in Australia
Nondenominational Christian schools in Adelaide
Educational institutions established in 1978
High schools in South Australia
Private schools in Adelaide